The 24th Artistic Gymnastics World Championships were held in Rotterdam, Netherlands, in 1987. Yelena Shushunova became the first woman to medal in every event; this was followed by Simone Biles of the United States in 2018.

Results

Men

Team final

All-around

Floor exercise

Pommel horse

Rings

Vault

Parallel bars

Horizontal bar

Women

Team final

All-around

Vault

Uneven bars

Balance beam

Floor exercise

Medals

References
Gymn Forum: World Championships Results
Gymnastics

World Artistic Gymnastics Championships
Sports competitions in Rotterdam
World Artistic Gymnastics Championships
World Artistic Gymnastics Championships
International gymnastics competitions hosted by the Netherlands